Johannes Christoffel Jan Mastenbroek (5 July 1902 – 23 May 1978) was a Dutch football manager who coached the Dutch East Indies national team at the 1938 FIFA World Cup.

Mastenbroek was born and raised in Dordrecht, son of Klaas Mastenbroek, a tailor, and Goverdina Rackwitsz. In 1924, he married Johanna van den Bovenkamp in Hengelo, at which time he was a schoolteacher.

He was the chairman of the Nederlandsch-Indische Voetbal Unie (Dutch East Indies Football Union) and the vice-president of the Dutch East Indies Olympic Committee.

References

1902 births
1978 deaths
Dutch football managers
Dutch expatriate football managers
1938 FIFA World Cup managers
Indonesia national football team managers
Dutch expatriate sportspeople in Indonesia